Hildegarde of Perche (died 14 April 1005 or later) was daughter of Hervé I, Count of Perche, and his wife Mélisende.  It is believed that she was a descendant of Adelaud de Loches, grandfather of Roscille de Loches, wife of Fulk I the Red, Count of Anjou.  Hildegarde became Viscountess of Châteaudun upon the death of her husband Hugues I Viscount of Châteaudun.

Hildegarde and Hugues had four children:
 Hugues II, Viscount of Châteaudun and Archbishop of Tours
 Adalaud, Seigneur de Château-Chinon
 Melisende, Viscountess of Châteaudun, married Fulcois, Count of Mortaigne, son of Rotrou, Seigneur de Nogent.
 Unnamed Daughter, married Albert II de la Ferté-en-Beauce, son of Albert I de la Ferté-en-Beauce and Godehildis de Bellême.

Hildegarde was succeeded by her son Hugues I as Viscount of Châteaudun when he reached the age of maturity.

Sources 
 Kerrebrouck, Patrick van., Nouvelle histoire généalogique de l'auguste maison de France, vol. 1: La Préhistoire des Capétiens. 1993.
 Tout, Thomas Frederick, The Empire and the Papacy: 918-1273, Periods of European History, London: Rivingtons, p. 279.
 Bury, J. B. (Editor), The Cambridge Medieval History, Volume III, Germany and the Western Empire, Cambridge University Press, 1922
 Reuter, Timothy (Editor), The New Cambridge Medieval History, Volume III, 900-1024, Cambridge University Press, 1999
 Medieval Lands Pronect, Perche, Mortagne

11th-century French people
11th-century women rulers
Year of birth unknown
Year of death uncertain
Viscounts of Châteaudun
10th-century women rulers